The 2023 NCAA Division I softball season, play of college softball in the United States organized by the National Collegiate Athletic Association (NCAA) at the Division I level, began in February 2023. The regular season, currently in progress, will be followed by many conference tournaments and championship series, and the overall season concludes with the 2023 NCAA Division I Softball Tournament and 2023 Women's College World Series. The Women's College World Series, consisting of the eight remaining teams in the NCAA Tournament and held annually in Oklahoma City at USA Softball Hall of Fame Stadium, will end in June 2023.

Realignment

Five schools began transitions from NCAA Division II to Division I on July 1, 2022.
 Lindenwood and Southern Indiana joined the Ohio Valley Conference (OVC).
 Queens joined the ASUN Conference.
 Stonehill joined the Northeast Conference (NEC).
  Texas A&M–Commerce joined the Southland Conference (SLC).

A total of 17 softball-sponsoring schools changed conferences after the 2022 season.
 Austin Peay, Belmont, and Murray State left the Ohio Valley Conference. Peay joined the ASUN, and Belmont and Murray State joined the Missouri Valley Conference (MVC).
 Bryant and Mount St. Mary's left the NEC, respectively for the America East Conference and Metro Atlantic Athletic Conference (MAAC).
 Hampton, Monmouth, North Carolina A&T , and Stony Brook joined the Colonial Athletic Association (CAA). Hampton and A&T left the Big South Conference (the latter after only one season), Monmouth the MAAC, and Stony Brook the America East.
 Hartford, which began a transition to NCAA Division III in the 2021–22 school year, left the America East to become an independent for 2022–23 before joining the D-III Commonwealth Coast Conference in 2023.
 James Madison, Marshall, Old Dominion, and Southern Miss joined the Sun Belt Conference (SBC). James Madison left the CAA, while the others left Conference USA (C-USA).
 Lamar, which had announced it would leave the WAC to return to its former home of the SLC in 2023–24, expedited this move to 2022–23.
 UIC left the Horizon League for the MVC.
 UT Arlington left the SBC for the WAC.

Incarnate Word had announced plans to leave the SLC for the WAC after the 2022 season, but days before that move was to take effect, the school announced it was staying in the SLC.

The 2023 season will be the last for 13 softball schools in their current conferences, as well as the aforementioned Hartford's only season as a D-I independent.
 BYU, Houston, and UCF will move to the Big 12 Conference. BYU is leaving the West Coast Conference, while the others are leaving the American Athletic Conference (The American).
 Campbell will leave the Big South for the CAA.
 Charlotte, Florida Atlantic, North Texas, UAB, and UTSA will leave C-USA for The American.
 Jacksonville State, Liberty, New Mexico State, and Sam Houston will all join C-USA. Jacksonville State and Liberty are leaving the ASUN, and New Mexico State and Sam Houston the WAC.

Other changes from 2022
Two Division I members, both sponsoring softball, adopted new names after the 2022 season. Neither school's nickname was affected.
 Dixie State University changed its forward-facing name to Utah Tech University in May 2022, ahead of the legal name change on July 1. The nickname remains Trailblazers.
 Houston Baptist University became Houston Christian University on September 21, 2022. The nickname remains Huskies.

Conference standings

See also
2023 NCAA Division I baseball season

References